William Nicholas Wood (born 29 November 1996) is an English professional footballer who plays as a left back for Dulwich Hamlet.

Early and personal life
Wood grew up in Burgess Hill and attended Oakmeeds Community College.

Career
Wood joined Southampton at the age of 11, signing a three-year professional contract in April 2015. He trialled with Portsmouth in December 2017, and signed a one-year contract with Accrington Stanley in May 2018. He made his professional debut on 14 August 2018, in the EFL Cup. In October 2018 he moved on loan to Havant & Waterlooville.

He was released by Accrington at the end of the 2018–19 season.

He signed for Dagenham & Redbridge in June 2019, and stated that he was looking forward to playing for the club. Wood only made four appearances for the Daggers as the season was curtailed due to Covid-19 and he was subsequently released at the end of the campaign.

On 19 August 2020 he signed for recently relegated National League South side Ebbsfleet United on a free transfer.

On 8 July 2022, Wood signed for Dulwich Hamlet.

Career statistics

References

1996 births
Living people
English footballers
Southampton F.C. players
Accrington Stanley F.C. players
Havant & Waterlooville F.C. players
Dagenham & Redbridge F.C. players
Ebbsfleet United F.C. players
Dulwich Hamlet F.C. players
English Football League players
National League (English football) players
Association football fullbacks